A definitive filmography for Léonce Perret would be virtually impossible given that he wrote, acted in, directed or produced more than 400 films. Of those, only roughly one third are still available today. The remaining copies are stored mostly at the Gaumont Film Library, the French Film Library, the National Cinematography Film Archives and in several other European film libraries such as the Nederlands Filmmuseum in Amsterdam.

Director

References

External links
 Nederlands Filmmuseum (Dutch)

Director filmographies
French filmographies